3rd Armoured Personnel Carrier Squadron was a detachment of 'Ratel IFVs' operating from Johannesburg in the 1980s.

The Squadron resorted under command of Group 18 in the 1980s trading buffel drivers for Commando units during the state of emergency.

References

South African Army
Armoured regiments of South Africa
Disbanded military units and formations in Johannesburg
Military units and formations established in 1980
Military units and formations of South Africa in the Border War